The Silkin Way is a 23km walking and cycling route through Telford starting in Bratton and  finishing in Coalport. In places the path follows the former Great Western Railway and the dry canal beds of the old Shropshire Canal and goes via Telford Town Centre and the Ironbridge Gorge World Heritage Site. Along the route the Silkin Way runs close to the many natural and historical features within Telford and shows great contrasts between futuristic architecture, woodlands, and mature parkland.

History 
The path is named after Lewis Silkin, the Minister responsible for the post-war Labour Government's New Towns Act 1946 and Access to the Countryside Act 1949. The Town Park to Coalport section of the route was opened in 1977 by the Prime Minister James Callaghan and the Bratton to Town Park northern section was added later. The path is marked with distinctive black iron wheels at important junctions.

Path description 

Silkin Way is a designated cycle route and for most of the way uses old railway paths and canal beds and is mainly on flat and fairly smooth surfaces. There are a few steps but most are wide and easy to push bikes up and down. Cyclists are asked to use the alternative cycle route around the Telford Shopping Centre section. The highest part is as you approach the Holyhead Road just before Telford Central railway station and is an ideal place to divide Silkin Way into two parts if you are walking. With many places to stop and see on the path, Telford & Wrekin Council say it is like a book - "you can read it all at once or just dip into it from time to time, digesting at your leisure".

Places of Interest 

The Silkin Way passes through many areas showing the history of Telford and those of particular interest include;

 Apley Castle Park
 Hadley Park Mill
 Telford Town Park
 Stirchley Chimney and Furnace
 Dawley and Stirchley railway station
 Madeley Windmill
 Madeley Market Station
 Blists Hill Victorian Town
 Lee Dingle Bridge
 Coalport China Museum
 Coalport Bridge

See also 

 Coalport Branch Line
 Ironbridge Gorge Museum Trust
 Long Distance Footpaths in the UK

References

External links

 Telford & Wrekin Council Silkin Way Map 
 gps-routes.co.uk Ordnance Survey Map 
 Plotaroute.com Silkin Way Route Planner

Long-distance footpaths in England
Telford
Rail trails in England